George Giokas (February 18, 1924 – October 7, 2014) was a Canadian football player who played for the Regina Roughriders. He played high school football at Regina High School.

References

1924 births
2014 deaths
Canadian football running backs
Saskatchewan Roughriders players
Players of Canadian football from Saskatchewan
Sportspeople from Regina, Saskatchewan